Abalando a Sua Fábrica (Portuguese for "Shaking Your Factory"), also referred to as 100% Charlie Brown Jr. – Abalando a Sua Fábrica as per the cover, is the fourth album by Brazilian alternative rock band Charlie Brown Jr. Released on April 30, 2001 through EMI, it was the band's first album not to come out through Virgin Records, to count with guest appearances by other musicians, and to be produced by either Rick Bonadio or Tadeu Patolla.

Abalando a Sua Fábrica sees the band shifting away from their previous rap rock-inflected sonority, advancing towards a "rawer" style more influenced by punk and garage rock. It was also recorded with all instrumental parts simultaneously instead of one at a time, as if they were recording live. The album spawned three hit singles: "Lugar ao Sol", "Hoje Eu Acordei Feliz" (which had a critically acclaimed music video directed by filmmaker André Abujamra) and "Como Tudo Deve Ser", included in the soundtrack of SBT's reality show Casa dos Artistas. Selling over 100,000 copies, it won a Gold certification by Pro-Música Brasil.

Critical reception
Writing for Galeria Musical, Anderson Nascimento gave the album a positive review, rating it with 3 stars out of 5 and calling it a "refreshing" release.

Track listing

Personnel
Charlie Brown Jr.
 Chorão – vocals
 Champignon – bass guitar
 Marcão – guitars
 Renato Pelado – drums

Production
 Torcuato Mariano – A&R
 Carlo Bartolini – production, mixing, recording
 Carlos Freitas – mastering
 Jade Pereira – mastering assistant
 Lulu Farah, Sanclair Lima – digital editing
 Outhenberg Pereira, Leonardo Waack, Marco Hoffer – additional engineering

Notes
  A. A rough equivalent English-language expression is "raising the roof"
  B. Acronym for "Tudo Filha da Puta" ("A Bunch of Motherfuckers")

References

2001 albums
EMI Records albums
Charlie Brown Jr. albums